Guet-Apens is the sixth studio album by the French progressive rock band Ange and the first without Jean Michel Brezovar and Daniel Haas. It was released in 1978.

Track listing
Side One:
"A Colin-Maillard"  – 08:06
"Dans Les Poches Du Berger"  – 05:41
"Un Trou Dans La Case"  – 05:30
"Virgule"  – 01:58
Side Two:
"Réveille-Toi !"  – 05:25
"Capitaine Cœur De Miel"  – 14:00

Personnel
 Christian Decamps – Lead Vocals, Acoustic Guitar, Keyboards
 Claude Demet – electric guitar, acoustic guitar
 Francis Decamps – Organ, A.R.P. Synthesizer, Keyboards, Backing Vocals
 Gerald Renard – bass, Backing Vocals
 Jean Pierre Guichard – drums, percussions

References
Guet-Apens on ange-updlm 
Guet-Apens on www.discogs.com

Ange albums
1978 albums